Saint-Ouen-lès-Parey (literally Saint-Ouen near Parey) is a commune in the Vosges department in Grand Est in northeastern France.

See also
Communes of the Vosges department

References

Communes of Vosges (department)